The Highgate Formation is a geologic formation in Vermont. It preserves fossils dating back to the Ordovician period.

See also

 List of fossiliferous stratigraphic units in Vermont
 Paleontology in Vermont

References
 

Ordovician geology of Vermont
Ordovician southern paleotemperate deposits